Strongygaster is a genus of flies in the family Tachinidae.

Species
S. californica (Townsend, 1908)
S. celer (Meigen, 1838)
S. didyma (Loew, 1863)
S. globula Robineau-Desvoidy, 1863
S. nishijimai Mesnil, 1957
S. robusta (Townsend, 1908)
S. triangulifera (Loew, 1863)

References

Phasiinae
Diptera of Europe
Diptera of North America